The ring-backed pipefish (Stipecampus cristatus) is a species of pipefish found in the waters of the Indian Ocean off the southern coast of Australia. This species grows to a length of  SL. This species is the only known member of its genus.

References

External links
 Fishes of Australia : Stipecampus cristatus

Syngnathidae
Marine fish of Southern Australia
Fish described in 1918
Taxa named by Allan Riverstone McCulloch
Taxa named by Edgar Ravenswood Waite